OpenSearch is a family of software consisting of a search engine (also named OpenSearch), and OpenSearch Dashboards, a data visualization dashboard for that search engine. The software started in 2021 as a fork of Elasticsearch and Kibana, with development led by Amazon Web Services.

History 
The project was created after Elastic NV changed the license of new versions of this software away from the open-source Apache License in favour of the Server Side Public License (SSPL). Amazon intends to build an open community with many stakeholders.  (Currently only Amazon Web Services has maintainership status and write access to the source code repositories, though they invite pull requests from anyone.) Other companies such as Logz.io, CrateDB, Red Hat and others have also announced an interest in building or joining a community to continue using and maintaining this open-source software.

OpenSearch 
OpenSearch is a Lucene-based search engine that started as a fork of version 7.10.2 of the Elasticsearch service. It has Elastic NV trademarks and telemetry removed. It is licensed under the Apache License, version 2, without a Contributor License Agreement.  The maintainers have made a commitment to remain completely compatible with Elasticsearch in its initial versions.

OpenSearch Dashboards 
OpenSearch Dashboards started as a fork of version 7.10.2 of Elastic's Kibana software, and is also under the Apache License, version 2.

See also 
 Elasticsearch#Licensing changes

References

External links
 Official website

Search engine software
Software forks